The 2017 FIVB Volleyball World Grand Prix was the 25th edition of the annual women's international volleyball tournament played by 32 teams between 7 July and 6 August. The Group 1 Final Round was held in Nanjing, China.

Defending champions Brazil won their record twelfth title in the tournament after a 3–2 win over Italy. Serbia captured their third bronze medal in the competition by defeating China in a rematch of the previous year olympic final. Natália Pereira from Brazil was elected the MVP for the second straight year.

In the Group 2 finals held in Ostrava, Czech Republic, Poland defeated South Korea in straight sets.

Moreover, Hungary finished atop of Group 3 at their first ever World Grand Prix participation after a 3–0 win over the home team in the final match in Canberra, Australia.

Qualification
Excluding , who withdrew from the tournament, the remaining 27 teams from the 2016 edition directly qualified.

1 Teams making their debuts.

Format

Intercontinental round
Group 1, the 12 teams were drawn into 3 pools of 4 teams for each of the three weeks of competition resulting in a total of 9 pools of 4 teams. In each pool, all teams will compete in round robin format. The results of all 9 pools will combine in 1 ranking table. The hosts and the top five ranked teams will play in the final round. The last ranked team after the Intercontinental Round could be relegated if the winners of the Group 2 Final Round can meet the promotion requirements set by the FIVB.
Group 2, the 12 teams were drawn in 9 pools of 4 teams. In each pool, all teams will compete in round robin format. The results of all 9 pools will combine in 1 ranking table. The hosts and the top three ranked teams will play in the final round. The last ranked team after the Intercontinental Round could be relegated if the winners of the Group 3 Final Round can meet the promotion requirements set by the FIVB.
Group 3, the 8 teams were drawn in 4 pools of 4 teams. In each pool, all teams will compete in round robin format. The results of all 4 pools will combine in 1 ranking table. The hosts and the top three ranked teams will play in the final round.

Final round
Group 1, the 6 teams in the final round will be divided in 2 pools determined by the serpentine system. The host team will be at the top position and the other teams will be allocated by their rankings in the preliminary round. The top 2 teams from each pool will play in the semifinals. The winning teams will play in the final match for the gold medals.
Group 2 and Group 3, the host team will face the last ranked team among the qualified teams in the semifinals. The other 2 teams will play against each other in the other semifinal. The winning teams will play in the final match for the gold medals and a chance for promotion.

Pool composition
The pools were announced on 14 September 2016.

Group 1

Group 2

Group 3

Final round

Competition schedule

Squads

Pool standing procedure
 Number of matches won
 Match points
 Sets ratio
 Points ratio
 If the tie continues as per the point ratio between two teams, the priority will be given to the team which won the last match between them. When the tie in points ratio is between three or more teams, a new classification of these teams in the terms of points 1, 2 and 3 will be made taking into consideration only the matches in which they were opposed to each other.
Match won 3–0 or 3–1: 3 match points for the winner, 0 match points for the loser
Match won 3–2: 2 match points for the winner, 1 match point for the loser

Intercontinental round

Group 1

Ranking

|}

Week 1

Pool A1
Venue:  Başkent Volleyball Hall, Ankara, Turkey
All times are Turkey Time (UTC+03:00).

|}

Pool B1
Venue:  Kunshan Stadium, Kunshan, China
All times are China Standard Time (UTC+08:00).

|}

Pool C1
Venue:  Omnisport Apeldoorn, Apeldoorn, Netherlands
All times are Central European Summer Time (UTC+02:00).

|}

Week 2

Pool D1
Venue:  Kamei Arena Sendai, Sendai, Japan
All times are Japan Standard Time (UTC+09:00).

|}

Pool E1
Venue:  Macau Forum, Macau, China
All times are China Standard Time (UTC+08:00).

|}

Pool F1
Venue:  DS Yantarny, Kaliningrad, Russia
All times are Kaliningrad Time (UTC+02:00).

|}

Week 3

Pool G1
Venue:  Hong Kong Coliseum, Hong Kong, China
All times are Hong Kong Time (UTC+08:00).

|}

Pool H1
Venue:  Indoor Stadium Huamark, Bangkok, Thailand
All times are Indochina Time (UTC+07:00).

|}

Pool I1
Venue:  Ginásio Aecim Tocantins, Cuiabá, Brazil
All times are Amazonas Time (UTC−04:00).

|}

Group 2

Ranking

|}

Week 1

Pool A2
Venue:  Bulstrad Arena, Ruse, Bulgaria
All times are Eastern European Summer Time (UTC+03:00).

|}

Pool B2
Venue:  Estadio Ruca Che, Neuquén, Argentina
All times are Argentina Time (UTC−03:00).

|}

Pool C2
Venue:  Coliseo Cerrado de Chiclayo, Chiclayo, Peru
All times are Peru Time (UTC−05:00).

|}

Week 2

Pool D2
Venue:  Baluan Sholak Sports Palace, Almaty, Kazakhstan
All times are Almaty Time (UTC+06:00).

|}

Pool E2
Venue:  Hala sportowo-widowiskowa KSZO, Ostrowiec Świętokrzyski, Poland
All times are Central European Summer Time (UTC+02:00).

|}

Pool F2
Venue:  Roberto Clemente Coliseum, San Juan, Puerto Rico
All times are Atlantic Standard Time (UTC−04:00).

|}

Week 3

Pool G2
Venue:  Richmond Olympic Oval, Richmond, Canada
All times are Pacific Standard Time (UTC−07:00).

|}

Pool H2
Venue:  Suwon Gymnasium, Suwon, South Korea
All times are Korea Standard Time (UTC+09:00).

|}

Pool I2
Venue:  Varaždin Arena, Varaždin, Croatia
All times are Central European Summer Time (UTC+02:00).

|}

Group 3

Ranking

|}

Week 1

Pool A3
Venue:  Gimnasio Olímpico, Aguascalientes City, Mexico
All times are Central Daylight Time (UTC−05:00).

|}

Pool B3
Venue:  Yaoundé Multipurpose Sports Complex, Yaoundé, Cameroon
All times are West Africa Time (UTC+01:00).

|}

Week 2

Pool C3
Venue:  Poliedro de Caracas, Caracas, Venezuela
All times are Atlantic Standard Time (UTC−04:00).

|}

Pool D3
Venue:  National Cycling Center, Port of Spain, Trinidad and Tobago
All times are Atlantic Standard Time (UTC−04:00).

|}

Final round

Group 3
Venue:  AIS Arena, Canberra, Australia
All times are Australian Eastern Standard Time (UTC+10:00).

Final four (Week 3)

Semifinals

|}

3rd place match

|}

Final

|}

Group 2
Venue:  Winter Stadium Ostrava-Poruba, Ostrava, Czech Republic
All times are Central European Summer Time (UTC+02:00).

Final four (Week 4)

Semifinals

|}

3rd place match

|}

Final

|}

Group 1
Venue:  Nanjing Olympic Sports Centre, Nanjing, China
All times are China Standard Time (UTC+08:00).

Pool play (Week 5)

Pool J1

|}

|}

Pool K1

|}

|}

Final four (Week 5)

Semifinals

|}

3rd place match

|}

Final

|}

Final standing

Awards

 Most Valuable Player
  Natália Pereira
 Best Outside Hitters
  Zhu Ting
  Natália Pereira
 Best Setter
  Ding Xia

 Best Middle Blockers
  Ana Beatriz Corrêa
  Milena Rašić
 Best Libero
  Monica De Gennaro
 Best Opposite
  Tijana Bošković

Statistics leaders
The statistics of each group follows the vis reports P2 and P3. The statistics include 6 volleyball skills; serve, reception, set, spike, block, and dig. The table below shows the top 5 ranked players in each skill by group plus top scorers as of 24 July 2017.

Best scorers
Best scorers determined by scored points from spike, block and serve.

Best spikers
Best spikers determined by successful spikes in percentage.

Best blockers
Best blockers determined by the average of stuff blocks per set.

Best servers
Best servers determined by the average of aces per set.

Best setters
Best setters determined by the average of running sets per set.

Best diggers
Best diggers determined by the average of successful digs per set.

Best receivers
Best receivers determined by efficient receptions in percentage.

See also
2017 FIVB Volleyball World League

References

External links

Official website
Fédération Internationale de Volleyball – official website
2017 FIVB Volleyball World Grand Prix – official website
Media Guide – Introduction and Tournament History at 2017 FIVB Volleyball World Grand Prix
Media Guide – Preview and Competition Information at 2017 FIVB Volleyball World Grand Prix
Media Guide – Team Information and Players statistics at 2017 FIVB Volleyball World Grand Prix
Media Guide – Referees at 2017 FIVB Volleyball World Grand Prix
Media Guide – Tournaments Records and History World Ranking at 2017 FIVB Volleyball World Grand Prix
Media Guide – Historical Information at 2017 FIVB Volleyball World Grand Prix
Media Guide – Media Information at 2017 FIVB Volleyball World Grand Prix

2017
2017 in women's volleyball
International volleyball competitions hosted by China
2017 in Chinese sport
July 2017 sports events in China
FIVB Volleyball World Grand Prix
Sport in Nanjing